This article is about reagent testing color charts.

Testing kits are distributed on a not-for-profit basis by DanceSafe and commercially.

It is advised to check the references for photos of reaction results.

Reagent testers might show the colour of the desired substance while not showing a different colour for a more dangerous additive. For this reason it is essential to use multiple different tests to show all adulterants.

Folin's—Mandelin

Marquis—Simon's

Custom reagents

See also
Counterfeit medications
Drug checking
Harm reduction

References

Adulteration
Color charts
Color charts
Drug culture
Color charts
Harm reduction
Drug-related lists